Webster is an unincorporated community in Darke County, in the U.S. state of Ohio.

History
Webster was laid out in 1835. A post office called Webster was established in 1852, and remained in operation until 1901.

References

Unincorporated communities in Darke County, Ohio
Unincorporated communities in Ohio